At the 1896 Summer Olympics, two tennis events were contested, both for men. They began on 8 April and continued on 9 April, 10 April, and 11 April. 13 or 15 competitors from six nations, including seven Greeks, took part in the tennis competition. Many of the doubles teams were of mixed nationality, including all three medalist pairs. None of the leading players of the time such as Wimbledon champion Harold Mahony, U.S champion Robert Wrenn, William Larned or Wilfred Baddeley participated. To strengthen the field, the organization added sportsmen from other Olympic events, including weightlifter Momčilo Tapavica, hammer thrower George S. Robertson and 800-metres runners Edwin Flack and Friedrich Traun.

Medal summary

These medals are retroactively assigned by the International Olympic Committee; at the time, winners were given a silver medal and runners-up bronze medals. Athletes coming third received no award.

Events

The silver-medal winning doubles team of Kasdaglis and Petrokokkinos appears in the IOC results database as a Greek team. In this regard:
 Kasdaglis, a Greek national who resided in Alexandria after living in Great Britain for years, is listed as Greek in the IOC database for the singles event, but he is listed as Egyptian or British in some sources.
 Petrokokkinos, who did not win a singles medal, is not identified with any nation in the IOC database, but all sources which state a nationality for Petrokokkinos list him as Greek.

Medal table

Competitors from Australia and Germany won medals only as a part of a mixed team in the doubles event.

Participating nations
A total of 13 tennis players from 6 nations competed at the Athens Games:

 
 
 
 
 
 

The International Society of Olympic Historians lists only thirteen players; according to them, British players Frank and George Marshall did not participate. Other sources do include the Marshalls, for a total of 15 players.

Notes

References
 International Olympic Committee results database
  (Digitally available at )
  (Excerpt available at )
 

 
1896 Summer Olympics events
1896
Olympics
1896 Olympics